Adam Gwon is an American composer and lyricist living in New York City.

Personal life
Gwon was born in Boston, and spent his childhood in Baltimore before attending New York University Tisch School of the Arts. While studying acting at NYU, Gwon was encouraged to pursue writing by a teacher, David Bucknam, and was later mentored by the musical theater writing team of Lynn Ahrens and Stephen Flaherty. Gwon is of Chinese-American and Jewish descent.

Professional life
Gwon made his off-Broadway debut in 2009 with Ordinary Days, the first musical production in Roundabout Theatre Company's black box space, Roundabout Underground. In 2011, Signature Theatre in Arlington, Virginia, premiered Gwon's musical The Boy Detective Fails, based on the novel by Joe Meno, as part of their American Musical Voices Project. South Coast Repertory commissioned and premiered his musical Cloudlands, written with Octavio Solis, in 2012.

In 2015, Gwon had two simultaneous world premieres, both co-written with Julia Jordan: Bernice Bobs Her Hair, adapted from the F. Scott Fitzgerald short story, at the Lyric Theatre of Oklahoma, and Cake Off at Signature Theatre in Arlington, Virginia. Cake Off received a Helen Hayes Award nomination for Outstanding Original Play or Musical Adaptation.

Village Theatre in Issaquah, Washington, produced the world premiere of Gwon's musical String, with a book by Sarah Hammond, in 2018.

Gwon's Ordinary Days was preserved on a cast album and has been produced in London's West End and around the world from Paris to Rio de Janeiro. A 2018 revival by the Keen Company was nominated for a Drama League Award for Best Revival of a Broadway or Off-Broadway Musical.

Gwon's song "I'll Be Here" was recorded by Audra McDonald on her album Go Back Home. McDonald has performed the song in concert, including at Carnegie Hall and Lincoln Center. It aired on PBS's Live from Lincoln Center in 2013.

He served a three-year term on the Tony Awards Nominating Committee, beginning in 2015.

Gwon's musical Scotland, PA, with book by Michael Mitnick, adapted from the cult 2001 film, premiered at Roundabout Theatre Company's Laura Pels Theatre in 2019.

Honors 
In 2008, Gwon was the fourth annual recipient of the Fred Ebb Foundation Award, presented to aspiring composer/lyricists.

In 2011, Gwon received the Kleban Prize for most promising musical theater lyricist. The award included a $100,000 cash prize.

Musicals
Ordinary Days (2009)
The Boy Detective Fails (2011)
Cloudlands (2012)
Bernice Bobs Her Hair (2015)
Cake Off (2015)
String (2018)
Scotland, PA (2019)

Discography
Ordinary Days
Go Back Home
The Essential Liz Callaway
Because
16 Stories

References

Year of birth missing (living people)
Living people
American lyricists
American male composers
People from Boston